Parepicedia fimbriata is a species of beetle in the family Cerambycidae, and the only species in the genus Parepicedia. It was described by Chevrolat in 1856.

References

Lamiini
Beetles described in 1856